The Beijing babbler (Rhopophilus pekinensis), also known as the white-browed Chinese warbler, Chinese hill warbler, or Chinese bush-dweller, is a species of bird in the genus Rhopophilus. It is now thought to be a close relative of the parrotbills and is placed in the family Paradoxornithidae; previously, it was placed in the families Cisticolidae, Timaliidae or Sylviidae. It is found in northern China and North Korea, and formerly occurred in South Korea. The species was first described by Robert Swinhoe in 1868.

References

 Del Hoyo, J.; Elliot, A. & Christie D. (editors). (2007). Handbook of the Birds of the World. Volume 12: Picathartes to Tits and Chickadees. Lynx Edicions. 
 Magnus Gelang, Alice Cibois, Eric Pasquet, Urban Olsson, Per Alström, Per G. P. Ericson: Phylogeny of babblers (Aves, Passeriformes): major lineages, family limits and classification, Zoologica Scripta, 38, 3, May 2009, pp 225–236 Article

Beijing babbler
Birds of China
Birds of Korea
Beijing babbler
Taxonomy articles created by Polbot